A  Totally Enclosed, Fan-Cooled (TEFC) electric motor is a type of industrial electric motor with an enclosure that does not permit outside air to freely circulate through the interior of the motor. An external fan blows outside air over the frame of the motor to cool it. This motor is arguably the most commonly used motor in ordinary industrial environments. TEFC enclosed motors usually cost more than open motors, but offer increased protection against weather, dirt, and moisture.

TEFC motors are constructed with a small fan on the rear shaft of the motor, covered by a housing. This fan forces air over the motor frame fins, and cools the motor. The enclosure is "Totally Enclosed". This  means that the motor is dust tight, and has a moderate water seal as well. TEFC motors are not secure against high pressure water nor submersible. They are also not explosion proof without additional modifications.

Applications / Types of TEFC Motors 
 Farm Duty Motors – These high torque and robustly designed motors are a good choice for many farm applications, being totally enclosed and protected from the environment. 
 "Wash Down" Motors – These motors are designed to withstand regular washing, such as found in a food processing facility.
 Rock Crusher Motors – These motors are an excellent choice for hammermills, pellet mills, and chippers for the biomass industry.
 Oil Well Pump Motors –
 Severe Duty Motors –
 Pool Pump Motors –   One of the quietest motor pump on the market, due to its permanent magnet motor and TEFC design
Compare to the ODP (Open Drip Proof) motor design, which has ventilation openings which are guarded to prevent falling water from entering the motor windings.

References
 Siemens Basics of AC Motors
 WorldWide Electric Motors

Electric motors